Harald Reinl (8 July 1908 in Bad Ischl, Austria – 9 October 1986 in Santa Cruz de Tenerife, Spain) was an Austrian film director. He is known for the films he made based on Edgar Wallace and Karl May books (see Karl May movies and Edgar Wallace movies) and also made mountain films, Heimatfilms, German war films and entries in such popular German film series as Dr. Mabuse, Jerry Cotton and Kommissar X.

Reinl began his career as an extra in the mountain films of Arnold Fanck. He worked as screenwriter on the film Tiefland directed by and starring Leni Riefenstahl. Reinl's first movie as director was the mountain film Mountain Crystal (1949). He was Oscar nominated for his documentary feature Chariots of the Gods (1970).

By the 1970s, he had semi-retired to the Canary Islands. In 1986, in his Tenerife retirement home, he was stabbed to death by Daniela Maria Delis, his alcoholic wife and a former actress from Czechoslovakia.

Filmography

Director

 Wilde Wasser (1937, short)
 Osterskitour in Tirol (1939)
 Mountain Crystal (1949)
  (1950)
  (1951)
 The Crucifix Carver of Ammergau (1952)
 Behind Monastery Walls (1952)
 The Monastery's Hunter (1953)
 Rose-Girl Resli (1954)
 The Silent Angel (1954)
 As Long as You Live (1955)
 The Twins from Zillertal (1957)
 Almenrausch and Edelweiss (1957)
 The Green Devils of Monte Cassino (1958)
 U 47 – Kapitänleutnant Prien (1958)
  (1958)
 Der Frosch mit der Maske (1959)
 Paradise for Sailors (1959)
 We Will Never Part (1960)
 The Terrible People (1960)
 The Forger of London (1961)
 The Return of Dr. Mabuse (1961) 
  (1962)
  (1962)
 Treasure of the Silver Lake (1962)
 The White Spider (1963)
 The Strangler of Blackmoor Castle (1963)
 Room 13 (1964)
 Apache Gold (1963)
 Last of the Renegades (1964)
 The Last Tomahawk (1965)
 The Desperado Trail (1965)
 The Sinister Monk (1965)
 Die Nibelungen, Teil 1 - Siegfried (1966) 
 Die Nibelungen, Teil 2 - Kriemhilds Rache (1967) 
 The Blood Demon (1967)
 The Valley of Death (1968)
 Death and Diamonds (1968)
 Death in the Red Jaguar (1968)
 Pepe, der Paukerschreck (1969)
 Dr. Fabian: Laughing Is the Best Medicine (1969)
 Dead Body on Broadway (1969)
 We'll Take Care of the Teachers (1970)
 Chariots of the Gods (1970)
 Tiger Gang (1971)
 Who Laughs Last, Laughs Best (1971)
 Holidays in Tyrol (1971)
 Sie liebten sich einen Sommer (1972)
 Cry of the Black Wolves (1972)
 The Heath is Green (1972)
 The Bloody Vultures of Alaska (1973)
 Hubertus Castle (1973)
 No Gold for a Dead Diver (1974)
 The Hunter of Fall (1974)
  (1982)

References

External links

 
 Harald Reinl - Biography on (re)Search my Trash

1908 births
1986 deaths
People from Bad Ischl
Austrian film directors
Austrian murder victims
Austrian expatriates in Spain
People murdered in Spain
Mariticides
Austrian people murdered abroad